Mehak Ali (Urdu: مہک علی, born: 24 February 1992) in Nankana Sahib, Pakistan. She is a Pakistani singer. She debuted in Bollywood with a song Baab E Rehmat in the 2017 film Sheitaan for which she was nominated for Mirchi Music Award for Upcoming Female Vocalist of The Year at the 10th Mirchi Music Awards, becoming the first Pakistani singer to be nominated for this award.

Early life
She was born on 24 February 1992 in Nankana Sahib and studied B.A. In 2013, she moved to Lahore along with her family. She started her music career with a local music competition at the age of 8. In 2012, she won the Pakistani music competition Music Talent Hunt.

Her debut song was "Baandi". She was featured in the 4th season of Nescafé Basement, a Pakistani music television series, with her song "Kameez Teri Kaali" which was a major hit in Pakistan.

Awards and nominations

Discography

Films

Singles

References

1992 births
Living people
Pakistani women singers
People from Nankana Sahib District